DenizBank A.Ş. is a large private bank in Turkey. It is currently owned by Emirates NBD. It was  owned and controlled by leading Russian bank Sberbank from 2012 to 2019. European financial services institution Dexia was the owner prior to this.

History 
Operations commenced in a hotel room in August that year, and the bank moved into its new headquarters in Karaköy the following month. Its first 13 branches (5 outside Istanbul) were also opened. With a revitalization program initiated, branches were opened under a new corporate identity. Expansion was supported by the acquisition of branch offices from other banks, including Tarişbank in 2002. Internet banking was introduced in 1999, and Deniz Yatırım was founded in 2001.

2002 saw the bank move into its new headquarters in Esentepe, Şişli, and the acquisition of Tarişbank. The bank's IPO on the Istanbul stock exchange took place in 2004.

On May 31, 2006, Dexia announced it had acquired a 75% stake in the company for US$2.437 billion. The remaining 25% of the shares were held publicly. It remained the primary shareholder until 2012, when Sberbank agreed to buy DenizBank for US$3.6 billion from the financially troubled Dexia.

Emirates NBD agreed to buy DenizBank from Sberbank in 2018. The deal was completed in July 2019.

Shareholders 

As of July 2019, the only shareholder of the bank is Emirates NBD (99.85% of shares).

Companies sold under agreement with the EU
Due to Dexia's agreement with the European Union, certain businesses were required to be sold. The ones sold from the DFSG are listed below.

Companies sold

See also

List of banks in Turkey
List of companies of Turkey

References

External links

Group Dexia official website
DenizYatırım Menkul Kıymetler A.Ş. (Deniz Investment Securities) (in Turkish, with English language available)
DenizBank AG (in German)
EkspresInvest Menkul Kıymetler A.Ş. (in English)
CJSC Dexia Bank Russia (in English)
Deniz Emeklilik ve Hayat A.Ş. (Deniz Pension and Life Insurance) (in Turkish only)
DenizBank Bahrain
Intertech Bilgi İşlem ve Pazarlama Ticaret A.Ş. (in English)

Sberbank of Russia
Banks of Turkey
Banks established in 1938
Companies listed on the Istanbul Stock Exchange
Companies based in Istanbul
2019 mergers and acquisitions
Turkish companies established in 1938